Sacred Cow is an album by Geggy Tah, released in 1996.

It contains "Whoever You Are," a #16 hit on the Billboard Modern Rock Tracks chart. It was used in a Mercedes-Benz commercial, in 2001.

Critical reception
Entertainment Weekly called the album "another fine, goofunky mess, chockful of weird hooks and dance-feverish energy." The Nation wrote that the band "is carving out a place devoted to fey weirdness, edgy grooves, and realityskewing lyrics." Trouser Press wrote: "Sacred Cow continues the duo’s tactful progression towards a modern version of Steely Dan-dom."

Track listing
All songs written by Tommy Jordan & Greg Kurstin, except as noted.
"Granddad's Opening Address" – 0:29
"Whoever You Are" – 4:33
"Lotta Stuff" (Jordan) – 3:10
"Century Plant 2000" – 6:17
"Sacred Cow" (Jordan) – 5:02
"House of Usher (Inside)" (Jordan) – 3:58
"Don't Close the Door" – 4:10
"Such a Beautiful Night" (Jordan) – 3:53
"She Withers" – 4:09
"Las Vegas with the Lights Out" – 3:27
"Mem" (Jordan) – 4:39
"Shed" (Jordan) – 3:45
"Gina" – 2:45

References

1996 albums
Albums produced by Greg Kurstin
Luaka Bop albums
Geggy Tah albums
Warner Records albums